Keith Baxter (born 29 April 1933) is a Welsh theatre, film and television actor.

Early years and RADA 

Born in Newport, Monmouthshire, in 1933, the son of a Merchant Navy sea captain, he was christened Keith Stanley Baxter-Wright and lived for a time in Romilly Road, Barry, Glamorgan. He was educated at Newport High School and Barry Grammar School. His early introduction to the stage was from his interest in making model theatres and stage scenery. He studied at London's Royal Academy of Dramatic Arts, during which period he shared a flat with a classmate, Alan Bates. He made his film debut in the 1957 remake of The Barretts of Wimpole Street and appeared uncredited as a detective in the British horror classic Peeping Tom (1960).

Films 

In 1960, Orson Welles selected Baxter to portray Prince Hal in his stage production Chimes at Midnight, which combined portions of the Shakespearean plays Henry IV, Part I, Henry IV, Part II, Henry V, Richard II, and The Merry Wives of Windsor and brought the comic figure of Falstaff to the forefront of a primarily tragic tale. Baxter repeated his performance in the 1965 film version. Additional film credits include Ash Wednesday (1973; with Elizabeth Taylor), Golden Rendezvous (1977), and Killing Time (1998).

Broadway 
In 1961, Baxter made his Broadway debut as King Henry VIII in A Man for All Seasons. Other New York City stage credits include The Affair (1962), Avanti! (1968), Sleuth (1970), Romantic Comedy (1980) and The Woman in Black (2001).

Other selected theatrical appearances
 Macbeth, Birmingham Repertory Theatre, Birmingham, England, 1972
 Vershinin, Three Sisters, Greenwich Theatre, London, 1973
 Benedick, Much Ado about Nothing, Royal Lyceum Theatre, Edinburgh, Scotland, 1973
 Antony, Antony and Cleopatra, Stratford Festival Theatre, Stratford, Ontario, 1976
 Witwoud, The Way of the World, Stratford Festival Theatre, 1976
 Vershinin, Three Sisters, Stratford Festival Theatre, 1976
 King, The Red Devil Battery Sign, Round House Theatre, then Phoenix Theatre, both London, 1977
 Lord Illingworth, A Woman of No Importance, Chichester Festival Theatre, 1978
 Antony, Antony and Cleopatra, Young Vic Theatre, London, 1982
 Elyot, Private Lives, Aldwych Theatre, London, 1990
 Cassius, Julius Caesar, Hartford Stage Company, 1990-1991
 The Resistible Rise of Arturo Ui, Chichester and The Duchess Theatre, 2013

Directing
 The Red Devil Battery Sign, Roundhouse and Phoenix Theatre, 1977
 Time and the Conways, 1988–89
 Rope, Chichester Festival Theatre then Wyndham's Theatre, 1994
 Dangerous Corner, Chichester Festival Theatre, 1994, and Whitehall Theatre, 1995
 Gaslight 
 After October, 1996–97
 Silhouette

Baxter has regularly directed shows at Shakespeare Theatre Company in Washington D.C., including: 
The Country Wife (2000)
The Rivals (2003)
Lady Windermere's Fan (2003)
The Imaginary Invalid (2008)
The Rivals (2009)
Mrs. Warren's Profession (2010) 
An Ideal Husband (2011)
The Importance of Being Earnest

Cleopatra 
Baxter was signed for the role of Octavian "Augustus" Caesar opposite Elizabeth Taylor's Cleopatra in the 1963 film of Cleopatra. Taylor's bout of pneumonia, soon after filming began, temporarily shut down filming. By the time she recovered, Baxter had other commitments and Roddy McDowall assumed the role. Baxter co-starred with Taylor in the film Ash Wednesday (1973). He also later played Mark Antony opposite Maggie Smith's Cleopatra in Antony and Cleopatra at the Stratford Festival in Canada in 1976.

Television work 
Baxter's television work includes appearances in Gideon's Way, The Avengers, Hawaii Five-O, Thriller(1976) and the 1998 mini-series Merlin.

Other work 
Baxter is the author of My Sentiments Exactly, memoirs. He has written several plays including 56 Duncan Terrace, Cavell and Barnaby and the Old Boys.

In 1971, he recorded an LP of several of the short stories of Saki for Caedmon Records under the title Reginald on House-Parties, and Other Stories.

He is an associate member of the Royal Academy of Dramatic Art

Theatre awards
1962 Theatre World Award for A Man for All Seasons
1971 Drama Desk Award for Sleuth

Filmography

Film

Television

References

External links

Keith Baxter at Internet Off-Broadway Database
Selected plays directed by Keith Baxter, Bristol University Theatre Archive

1933 births
Alumni of RADA
Living people
People from Newport, Wales
People educated at Barry Comprehensive School
People educated at Newport High School
Welsh male film actors
Welsh male stage actors
Welsh male television actors